Amamanganops is a monotypic genus of Filipino wall spiders containing the single species, Amamanganops baginawa. It was first described by S. C. Crews & Mark Stephen Harvey in 2011, and is found in the Philippines.

See also
 List of Selenopidae species

References

Monotypic Araneomorphae genera
Selenopidae
Spiders of Asia